Brian Sørensen may refer to:
 Brian Sørensen (football manager), Danish football coach
 Brian Buur, né Sørensen, Danish darts player
 Brian Holm Sørensen, Danish cyclist